Achiet-le-Grand is a commune in the Pas-de-Calais department in northern France.

Geography
A farming village located 12 miles (19 km) south of Arras, at the D7 and D9 road junction. The SNCF railway has a station here.

History
The commune was involved in the theatre of operations of the Battle of Bapaume (1871), during the Franco-Prussian War.

The village was twinned with Kings Langley in Hertfordshire, England in November 2009, in honour of Christopher Cox VC from that village  who won a Victoria Cross  in fighting near Achiet-le-Grand in World War I.

Population

Sights
 The church of St.John, dating from the twentieth century.
 A World War I cemetery.

See also
Communes of the Pas-de-Calais department

References

External links

 The World War I cemetery
 South Africans buried in Achiet-le-Grand Communal Cemetery Extension
 A personal website about Achiet-le-Grand
 Achiet-le-Grand during WW1
 Official communal website (fr)

Communes of Pas-de-Calais